Kalaveti Tuiyabayaba is a Fijian rugby league footballer who represented Fiji in the 2000 World Cup.

References

Living people
Fijian rugby league players
Fiji national rugby league team players
Rugby league halfbacks
Place of birth missing (living people)
Year of birth missing (living people)